Iridopsis ephyraria, the pale-winged gray, is a moth of the family Geometridae. The species was first described by Francis Walker in 1860. It is found in the United States and southern Canada east of the Rocky Mountains, from New Brunswick to Florida, west to Texas and north to Alberta.

The wingspan is 23–28 mm. The wings are whitish gray with variable overlay of yellowish brown and darker gray. The lines are black. The postmedial line has a rounded bulge near the forewing costa. There are four black spots along the costa. The discal spots are large and hollow on all wings.

Adults are on wing from June to September.

The larvae feed on a wide range of woody plants Fraxinus, Abies balsamea, Betula, Prunus virginiana, Tsuga canadensis, Ulmus, Ribes uva-crispa, Acer and Salix species. The larvae are light brown and mimic twigs. The head is flat faced, mottled with tan, white, black and occasionally pink. There are often black spots forming a dark blotch to either side of the triangle.

References

External links

"Life history of Iridopsis ephyraria, (Lepidoptera: Geometridae), a defoliator of eastern hemlock in eastern Canada".

Boarmiini
Moths described in 1860
Moths of North America